Ikot Ese may refer to the following places in Akwa Ibom state, Nigeria:

 Ikot Ese, Etinan, a village in the Etinan local government area
 Ikot Ese, Uruan, a village in the Uruan local government area